AAFF may refer to:

 Ann Arbor Film Festival, an annual film festival held in Ann Arbor, United States
 Asian Animation Film Festival, a new festival hosted in Chicago
 Architect Africa Film Festival, an annual architectural film festival held in South Africa
 Asociación Nacional de Administradores de fincas de España: National Association of Administrators of Finance in Spain.